The  Cedar Rapids Titans season is the team's seventh season as a professional indoor football franchise and seventh in the Indoor Football League (IFL). One of six teams that compete in the IFL for the 2018 season.

Led by head coach Marvin Jones, the Titans play their home games at the U.S. Cellular Center in downtown Cedar Rapids, Iowa.

Standings

Staff

Regular season
Key:

Roster

References

External links
 Cedar Rapids Titans official statistics

Cedar Rapids River Kings
Cedar Rapids Titans
Cedar Rapids Titans